Rodnikovka is a rural locality (a selo) in Miyakinsky Selsoviet, Miyakinsky District, Bashkortostan, Russia. The population was 841 as of 2010. There are 10 streets.

Geography 
Rodnikovka is located 5 km south of Kirgiz-Miyaki (the district's administrative centre) by road. Kirgiz-Miyaki is the nearest rural locality.

References 

Rural localities in Miyakinsky District